As with many consumer products, early bicycles were purchased solely for their usefulness or fashionableness and discarded as they wore out or were replaced by newer models. Some items were thrown into storage and survived, but many others went to the scrapyard. Decades later, those with an interest in cycling and history began to seek out older bikes, collecting different varieties. Like other forms of collecting, bike collectors can be completists or specialists, and many have extensive holdings in bike parts or literature, in addition to complete bicycles.

North America
Due to the tremendous number of bicycle manufacturers and models that have appeared over the past 150 years, most collectors specialize in a particular style or period of bicycles. Currently, there are three primary periods of particular collector interest in North America, although many collectors will further specialize in the products of a single manufacturer or even examples of a single model within a given period. The major periods are:

 High Wheel and Antique (Early 19th century-1933)—Early bicycles were all experiments and came in a dizzying variety of shapes. From primitive “hobby horses” to the giant High Wheel or Penny Farthing bicycles of the 1880s, collectors have gathered and studied these strange designs. Although many of these models are extremely rare, their peculiar shapes are fascinating and offer insight into the development of mechanical solutions that eventually resulted in the fairly standardized “safety bicycle” of the 1890s. Also included in this category are the early safety bicycles, which featured wooden rim wheels, skinny tires, and slightly larger wheel diameter than what became standard later.
 Balloon Tire Classics (1933–1965)—This period is dominated by the cruiser style bicycles of Schwinn and other manufacturers. These bikes featured wide balloon tires and heavy frames, for improved durability. The children’s market was a focus during this era, leading to elaborate streamline styling and loads of accessories: lights, speedometers, springer (suspension) forks, horns, luggage racks, and more. These bikes were neglected and abused until the mid 1970s when Leon Dixon began penning a series of articles for magazines such as Popular Mechanics and organized the earliest collector swap meets. Soon prices of old cruisers began to rise. Today, this is probably the most popular area of bike collecting.
 Wheelie bikes and Early BMX (1965–1980)—This fast-growing segment of the hobby in North America focuses on the Schwinn Sting-Rays, Raleigh Choppers and other banana seat bikes of the 1960s and the early BMX models that grew out of them. The Sting-Rays offered a huge assortment of accessories, much like the old cruisers, but over this period the bikes were stripped down and made stronger and stronger to withstand the rigors of dirt track racing and trick riding. Prices in this category have begun to rise recently as the children of the 1960s reach the age where they have the money, the time, and the inclination to collect.

See also
 History of the bicycle
 Schwinn Bicycle Company
 Cruiser bicycle
 BMX
 Collecting
Bicycle

References

External links
 Nostalgia BMX - Community, forums, photos of old school BMX
 Dave's Vintage Bicycles - Huge photo archive of Classic and Antique bicycles plus restoration services
 National Bicycle History Archive of America - Archive of articles and photos about classic balloon tire bikes
 Bunchobikes – Extensive photo site of one man’s collection of balloon tire bikes
 Classic and Antigue Bicycle Exchange – Newsletter for old bike fans
 Bicycle Chronicles - Site dedicated to collectors of old Schwinn cruisers, with huge photo database
 Bicycle Museum of America
 Vintage Old School BMX Australia - Site dedicated to Vintage and Old School BMX in Australia

Collecting
Cycling